Sri Sarguru Tribal High School (SSTHS) is a Tamil medium tribal high school located on Mount Pleasant in Coonoor, Tamil Nadu, India.

History 
The school was opened in 1964 by Ramalinga Adigalar. Officially it was announced a government aided school under G.O.-Ms. No.: 809 Education dated 22 May 1964.

In August 2008, the school officially started a project in co-operation with ICDE India hosting volunteers to let them teach physical education classes and spoken English classes.

Education 
The school educates the students from 6th standard to their 10th standard exams. The school runs on government norms and offers mathematics, English, Tamil, social science, science, physical education as well as value education, environmental studies and life-oriented education.

Headteachers 
Kulan (1964–1994)
K. M. Sivalingam (1994 – 31 July 2000)
B. Rahman (1 August 2000 – 31 May 2003)
T. Tathan (1 June 2003 – 31 May 2004)
T. Navaneethakrishnan (since 1 June 2004)

Students 
Starting with over 600 students the number of students decreased over the years to 203 in the academic year 2008/09. Students mainly come from the Nilgiri District.

During the academic year, students stay at home or in hostels. In 2009/10 the school co-operated with these hostels: Sri Sarguru Ashram, two government hostels and DCM Home Bharatnagar Wellington.

Awards 
In 2006, the school won the Viswa Sewa Award being the best school in the Nilgiri District in educating poor students. The award was made by the former Supreme Court Judge S. Mohan and High Court Judge S. K. Krishnan on the recommendation of the local Rotary Lion's Club of Nilgiris.

Bibliography
Statistical yearbook of Sri Sarguru Tribal High School (since 1964)

High schools and secondary schools in Tamil Nadu
Schools in Nilgiris district
Tamil-language schools
Educational institutions established in 1964
1964 establishments in Madras State